The Butt Baronetcy, of Westminster in the County of London, was a title in the Baronetage of the United Kingdom. It was created on 25 July 1929 for Sir Alfred Butt, who represented Balham and Tooting in the House of Commons as a Unionist between 1922 and 1936. The title became extinct on the death of his son, the second Baronet, in 1999.

Butt baronets, of Westminster (1929)
Sir Alfred Butt, 1st Baronet (1878–1962)
Sir (Alfred) Kenneth Dudley Butt, 2nd Baronet (1908–1999)

Notes

References
Kidd, Charles, Williamson, David (editors). Debrett's Peerage and Baronetage (1990 edition). New York: St Martin's Press, 1990, 

Extinct baronetcies in the Baronetage of the United Kingdom